Luís Manuel Rodrigues Alves (born 28 September 1971) is a Portuguese retired footballer who played as a forward.

Football career
Born in Lisbon, Alves spent the majority of his career playing for third division clubs. He made his professional debuts in the 1990–91 season, with Odivelas F.C. in the fourth division.

Alves first came to prominence in 1999–2000, scoring nine goals for C.S.D. Câmara de Lobos in the third level and subsequently earning a contract with C.D. Nacional of division two, where he appeared sparingly over the course of three campaigns, being relegated in his second.

In the 2001 summer, after a failed second stint with Nacional, Alves moved to another team in Madeira, A.D. Camacha, netting 16 goals in his only season. He then signed for his fifth club in the region, A.D. Pontassolense (also in the third tier), where he repeated individual numbers in his first year.

In 2003–04, 32-year-old Alves scored 15 goals for Pontassolense, thus becoming the third division – south zone – runner-up topscorer behind S.C. Olhanense's Edinho. He only found the net five times in the following campaign and, subsequently, moved to amateur football where he played a couple of years for two sides before retiring.

References

External links

1971 births
Living people
Footballers from Lisbon
Portuguese footballers
Association football forwards
Liga Portugal 2 players
Segunda Divisão players
Odivelas F.C. players
C.D. Nacional players
União Montemor players
Seixal F.C. players
A.D. Camacha players